Nine-a-side football is a sport based on Australian rules football played informally by Aussie rules clubs but not yet an official sport in its own right.

9-a-side games are sometimes played on half size fields that are typically rectangular or more commonly rugby or soccer fields, with 9 players on the field at any one time, typically consisting of 3 forwards, 3 backs and 3 centre players.  Often two games are played at the same time on a single Australian Rules or cricket pitch.  Other times, 9-a-side makes use of the full space of the field when a full complement of players is not available.  This variety is a more open, running variety of Australian rules.

Rules
The following rules apply in 9-a-side football  as played by Aussie Rules UK:
 Up to 9 players on each team, with 3 players each designated as forwards, centres and backs
 After each goal the players must be in their respective third of the pitch but may rove freely after the ball-up
 Goals and behinds may only be scored from within the forward zone
 Players may bounce the ball only once before disposing of it
 If the ball goes out of play (whether on the full or not) the nearest opponent shall kick the ball back into play

All other rules remain unchanged.   www.9asidefootball.com

Advantages
Australian Rules football has struggled to develop outside Australia partly because the game is highly resource intensive. A game requires the use of a large cricket oval, many players (40 including interchanges) and several officials. The adaptation of the game to rugby fields requires far fewer players and a pitch that is more readily available, and as a result, many more people are being introduced to the game outside Australia.

9-a-side football international

Examples of official tournaments held under these rules include:
 The EU Cup 
 Bali Nines
 Aussie Rules UK National League and India

Existing formats
AFL 9s, sanctioned by the Australian Football League is the non-contact game replacing the earlier Rec Footy.
Touch Aussie Rules, sanctioned by Aussie Rules UK is the non-contact game played in the UK.
Metro Footy is a 9-a-side game played on gridiron fields in the United States.

See also
 Six-man football (Gridiron)
 Eight-man football (Gridiron)
 five a side football (Soccer)
 Rugby sevens
 Rugby tens

References

Variations of Australian rules football
Sports originating in Australia